Ants Laikmaa (5 May 1866 – 19 November 1942) was an Estonian painter.

Life
Ants Laikmaa (until 1935 Hans Laipman) was born in Paiba farm, Araste village, Märjamaa Parish. He was the 13th child of a poor Estonian family. He attended schools in Velise, Haapsalu and Lihula. His mother died when he was a child. Laikmaa discovered early his interest in painting. He studied from 1891 to 1893 and 1896/97 at the Düsseldorf Art Academy. From 1897 to 1899 he was working in Düsseldorf. He is associated with the Düsseldorf school of painting. In autumn of 1899 he returned to Tallinn. From 1900 to 1907 Laikmaa worked as an artist in Tallinn and Haapsalu. Study led him to Belgium, France, Austria, Finland and the Netherlands. 1901 he organized the first ever Estonian art exhibition in Tallinn, 1906 followed by the first art exhibition in Tartu. 1903, he founded a studio in Tallinn. 1907 he founded the Estonian Art Association (Eesti Kunstiselts). 

In 1904 the 38-year-old Laikmaa met the great love of his life, the 21-year-old Marie Under, one of the best-known poets of the time. In the same year he painted two portraits of her, counted as the most famous of Laikmaa paintings. 
From 1907 to 1909 he was mainly in Finland. 1909 to 1913 he traveled to the major art cities in Europe. He lived from 1910 to 1912 in Capri and Tunisia. From 1913 to 1931 Laikmaa worked as a freelance artist and art teacher in Tallinn. Among others, his pupils included the young Alfred Rosenberg. 1927 his only daughter Aino Marie (later Anu Kilpiö, died 1969) was born, a child of his model nicknamed "Miku". In 1932 Laikmaa settled in the vicinity of Taebla in Lääne County, on his farm in Kadarpiku village designed with a 7-hectare park, where he remained and worked until the end of his life. 
Ants Laikmaa died in November 1942 in Kadarpiku, where he is also buried. Laikmaa remained unmarried all his life. His farm was opened in 1960 as a museum to his life and work.

Work
Ants Laikmaa is best known for his pastel painting. He brought impressionism to Estonia, and often painted landscapes, mostly with sharp colors. His portraits of the intellectual and artistic elite of Estonia are also well known. He was also politically active. Above all, he promoted the training and promotion of Estonian art and was one of the founders of the Estonian National Museum (Eesti Rahva Muuseum) in Tartu.

Best-known works
Self Portrait (1902)
Lääne neiu (1903; 'Maiden from Lääne County')
Portrait of Marie Under (1904)
Vigala taat (1904; 'Old man from Vigala')
Portrait of August Kitzberg (1915)

Gallery

References

External links

Ants Laikmaa house-museum

1866 births
1942 deaths
People from Märjamaa Parish
People from Kreis Wiek
19th-century Estonian painters
19th-century Estonian male artists
20th-century Estonian painters
20th-century Estonian male artists
Kunstakademie Düsseldorf alumni
Düsseldorf school of painting